Faraj Abdullah Al-Ghashayan (born April 28, 2000) is a Saudi Arabian  professional footballer who currently plays for Al-Qadsiah as a winger.

Career
Al-Ghashayan was promoted to the first team in the 2019–2020 season and participated in the first match in the 2019 AFC Champions League against Al-Wahda which ended in a 1-1 draw. On 1 February 2020, Al-Ghashayan joined Al-Qadsiah on loan in a deal which saw Khalid Al-Ghannam join Al-Nassr. On 16 July 2022, Al-Ghashayan joined Al-Qadsiah on a permanent deal.

Club career statistics

Honours

International
Saudi Arabia U-20
 AFC U-19 Championship: 2018

References

External links

2000 births
Saudi Arabian footballers
Saudi Arabia youth international footballers
Sportspeople from Riyadh
Living people
Al Nassr FC players
Al-Qadsiah FC players
Saudi Professional League players
Saudi First Division League players
Association football wingers